Liscomb is a small community in the Canadian province of Nova Scotia, located in the Municipality of the District of Saint Mary's in Guysborough County.

Communities in Guysborough County, Nova Scotia
General Service Areas in Nova Scotia
Populated coastal places in Canada